Terry Gene Enyart (October 10, 1950 – February 15, 2007) was a professional baseball pitcher who appeared in two games for the  Montreal Expos.

On February 15, 2007, Enyart struck his wife, shot his son in the hand, and committed suicide by a self-inflicted gunshot wound to his head. He was 56 years old.

References

External links
, or Retrosheet

1950 births
2007 deaths
American expatriate baseball players in Canada
American expatriate baseball players in Mexico
Baseball players from Ohio
Broncos de Reynosa players
Charlotte Hornets (baseball) players
Chipola Indians baseball players
Denver Bears players
Gulf Coast Twins players
Indianapolis Indians players
Major League Baseball pitchers
Memphis Blues players
Mexican League baseball pitchers
Montgomery Rebels players
Montreal Expos players
Navegantes del Magallanes players
American expatriate baseball players in Venezuela
Ogden A's players
Orlando Twins players
People from Ironton, Ohio
Québec Carnavals players
Quebec Metros players
Suicides by firearm in Florida
Vancouver Canadians players
West Palm Beach Expos players
2007 suicides